Hepsetus cuvieri, sometimes known as the African pike or Kafue pike characin, is a predatory freshwater fish found in southern Africa. This species was described in 1861 by the French naturalist Francis de Laporte de Castelnau.

The fish is named in honor of Georges Cuvier (1769-1832).

Distribution

This species is found in the southern third of Africa where it inhabits the Quanza, Cunene, Okavango, upper Zambezi, Kafue and Congo River basins. In the Congo River basin, it is only known from the southernmost part of the Kasai system and the lower Luapula.

Description

H. cuvieri can be distinguished from Hepsetus odoe as it has a lower count of gill rakers on the first gill arch, of 8–13 as opposed to 14–21; a normally higher number of scales between the lateral line and the dorsal fin, 10.5–11.5 as opposed to 7.5–10.5; a typically higher number of scales from the adipose fin and the lateral line, 6.5–7.5 as opposed to 4.5–6.5; and a distinctive colour pattern characterized by a mottled appearance of the dark brown blotches on the lateral surface of the body versus distinct vertical brown stripes in that region in H. odoe.

Biology

H. cuvieri prefers quiet, deep water, such as channels and oxbow lakes; the juveniles and fry inhabit dense marginal vegetation. The adults are mainly piscivorous while juveniles feed on smaller prey such as invertebrates and small fish. H. cuvieri is a lurking,  ambush predator found in marginal swamps and lagoons of large floodplain rivers. It breeds over the summer months, spawning more than once in a free-floating bubblenest which the adults guard; it is relatively short-lived, only living for 4–5 years.

Immediately before spawning, the male and female pair up and become territorial, building large bubblenests amongst surface vegetation. They deposit the eggs  into the nest and the fry move to the base of the nest upon hatching. Here they attach themselves via a gland on the top of their heads. The nest is guarded by the parents up to the point of hatching. The fry remain attached to the nest for around 4 days after which point they begin to disperse, as the nest starts to disintegrate. The fry continue to use on the sticky gland on their heads to attach themselves to pieces of vegetation etc., for a short time. Hepsetus cuvieri lives in the more unpredictable seasonal swamp and has flexible spawning times because their bubblenests allow them to reproduce even when levels of dissolved oxygen are low, so they do not have a distinct breeding season.

Hepsetus cuvieri overlaps in its distribution and habitat with the African tigerfish Hydrocynus vittatus and there is also a large degree of overlap in prey.  The tigerfish prefers open, better oxygenated water and hunts by rapid pursuit of prey while H. cuvieri prefers dense vegetation where it is an ambush predator. H. vittatus is also known to prey on H. cuvieri, while it is almost unknown for H. cuvieri to prey on tigerfish.

Taxonomy

Formerly considered as a synonym of Hepsetus odoe sensu lato but that species has now been split into a number of species with H. cuvieri as the southernmost species of Hepsetus.

References

Freshwater fish of Africa
Characiformes
Taxa named by François-Louis Laporte, comte de Castelnau
Fish described in 1861